L'intrepido is a 2013 Italian comedy film directed by Gianni Amelio. It was screened in the main competition section of the 70th Venice International Film Festival and in the Special Presentation section at the 2013 Toronto International Film Festival.

Plot
Antonio lives in Milan, but does not have a steady job. His specialty is to replace other workers for a short time, since he likes to pretend to be someone else. But Antonio soon realizes he must do something more concrete in his life, and so devotes to his son, a young musician, who often fears of performing in concert.

Cast
 Antonio Albanese as Antonio Pane
 Livia Rossi as Lucia
 Gabriele Rendina as Ivo Pane
 Toni Santagata as Maltese
 Sandra Ceccarelli as Adriana

References

External links
 

2013 films
2013 comedy-drama films
Italian comedy-drama films
2010s Italian-language films
Films directed by Gianni Amelio
Films set in Milan
Films about poverty
2010s Italian films